Karyala is a village and union council, an administrative subdivision, of Chakwal District in the Punjab Province of Pakistan. It is part of Chakwal Tehsil. The village stands on the top of the Surla hills. This part of the country is known as Dhani meaning rich. A few kilometres away are the Khewra Salt Mines, which are some of the oldest in the world, and coal mines of Dandot.

Location
The town is about ten kilometres from Chakwal on the road to the Katas Raj Temple Complex.

History

Katas Lake
The Katas lake is a significant landmark in the region. Legend connects it to the Mahabharata. It is believed to be the very pool, where the Pandava, Yudhishthira was tested by his father, Lord Yama/Dharma in the form of a Yaksha. A great Hindu fair used to be held there up to 1947.

References

Union councils of Chakwal District
Populated places in Chakwal District